Ditt Inre is an indie duo from Stockholm, Sweden, consisting of Hampus Klint and Einar Andersson, currently signed to Cascine. Ditt Inre has been featured by Pitchfork, The Guardian, Vice, Stereogum, and The Line of Best Fit amongst others.

Discography

Albums 
 Värd mer än guld (2013). LP on Cascine, CD on Tugboat Records.

EP's 
 En värld i brand (2012). Cascine.

Singles 
 Formulär 1A - The Remixes (2014). Cascine.
 Inget Val/Din Röst (2012). Cascine.

Compilation appearances 
 Cascine Standouts: 2010-2012 (2012). Cascine.

References

External links
Ditt Inre on Facebook
Ditt Inre on Soundcloud
Ditt Inre on Discogs
Ditt Inre on last.fm
Cascine
Tugboat Records

Swedish electronic music groups
Electronic music duos
Musical groups established in 2011
Swedish indie pop groups
Cascine artists
2011 establishments in Sweden